Sol Paragliders (Sun Paragliders) is a Brazilian aircraft manufacturer based in Jaraguá do Sul and founded by Ary Carlos Pradi. The company specializes in the design and manufacture of paragliders and paramotor wings in the form of ready-to-fly aircraft. The company also produces paragliding harnesses, rescue parachutes and accessories.

History
The company was founded in 1979 as a hang glider manufacturer and started building paragliders in 1991 under the name FUN Gliders. By 1993, 70% of their business was for export. The company name was changed to Sol Paragliders in 1996 and shortly thereafter the company started a partnership with Nova Performance Paragliders of Austria. By 1999 the company had its own design and certification staff and decided to take its brand globally without partners. Between 2000 and 2010 pilots flying Sol gliders set 15 world records. In 2004 the company was certified by the German Deutscher Hängegleiterverband e.V. (DHV)

Sol's Super Sonic established itself as a leading design for flying paraglider aerobatics, with its introduction in 2005. In 2009 Kamira Pereira set four new women's world records on Sol gliders, while Horacio Llorens set the world record spins with 281 set in Nepal, an achievement that got widespread news coverage. The Sol Tracer was a highly competitive design and Frank Brown was named Brazilian champion for the ninth time and Kamira Pereira women's champion for the fifth time flying the design. In 2011 the company won an Innovation Award of the Year for its Sol One design. In 2012 four more world records were set on Sol gliders.

The company also has a museum that was opened on 18 February 2011.

In 2004 the company had about 50 employees. By 2010 that had grown to 120 employees, of whom 22 were paraglider pilots.

Aircraft 

Summary of aircraft built by Sol:
Sol Atmus
Sol Auster
Sol Axion
Sol Balance
Sol Caesar
Sol Classic
Sol Cyclone
Sol Dynamic
Sol Eclipse
Sol Ellus
Sol Flexus
Sol Hercules
Sol Hoops
Sol Impulse
Sol Jumbo
Sol Kangaroo
Sol Koala
Sol Kuat
Sol Lotus
Sol Magic Fun
Sol Neon
Sol Onyx
Sol Pero
Sol Prymus
Sol Quasar
Sol One
Sol Sonic
Sol Faly Stabilis
Sol Start
Sol Super Sonic
Sol Syncross
Sol Synergy
Sol Taxi
Sol Torck
Sol Tornado
Sol TR2
Sol Tracer
Sol Unno
Sol Vello
Sol Yaris
Sol Yess

References

External links

Aircraft manufacturers of Brazil
Powered parachutes
Paragliders
Vehicle manufacturing companies established in 1979
1979 establishments in Brazil
Brazilian brands